Gilbert Edgar Jose (1 November 1898 – 27 March 1942) was an Australian surgeon and first-class cricketer who played for South Australia. He died whilst a prisoner of war in Changi Prison during World War II.

Early life
Jose was born in Taizhou, China, where his father, George Jose, worked as a CMS missionary.

Back in Australia, Jose attended St Peter's College in Adelaide.

Cricket career
Jose made his first-class debut for South Australia in the 1918/19 season, against Victoria at the Melbourne Cricket Ground. He scored a pair, run out without scoring in the first innings and bowled for 0 by Ted McDonald in his second innings. Although he only batted in the lower order, Jose wasn't called on to bowl in the match.

His second first-class appearance came in 1920/21, at the Adelaide Oval, against the touring Marylebone Cricket Club. He came in at six in the batting order and scored 16 in his first innings. Promoted up the order to five in the second innings, Jose scored just two.

Military service
Jose, a Fellow of the Royal Australasian College of Surgeons, served with the Australian Army Medical Corps in World War II. A Major, he was assigned to the 10th Australian General Hospital and was taken prisoner by the Japanese. He was kept as a prisoner of war in Changi, Singapore and died from dysentery on 27 March 1942.

Family
He had two brothers, Ivan Bede Jose and Wilfrid (commonly misspelled Wilfred) Oswald Jose, who both served in the first World War. Ivan was awarded a Military Cross and was later the Chief Surgeon at the Royal Adelaide Hospital. Wilfrid was killed in action in Noreuil, France in April 1917.

His son, Tony Jose, was also a first-class cricketer.

References

External links

1898 births
Australian cricketers
South Australia cricketers
Australian military doctors
Australian military personnel killed in World War II
Australian prisoners of war
World War II prisoners of war held by Japan
Deaths from dysentery
1942 deaths
Australian Army personnel of World War II
People from Taizhou, Zhejiang